Elmer Earl "Butch" Hartman IV (born January 10, 1965) is an American animator, writer, producer, director, and voice actor. He is most known for creating the Nickelodeon series The Fairly OddParents, Danny Phantom, T.U.F.F. Puppy, and Bunsen Is a Beast. Hartman also owns a production company, Billionfold Inc., which he uses primarily to produce his shows. Hartman was an executive producer on The Fairly OddParents for the entirety of its 16-year run.

On February 8, 2018, Hartman announced in a YouTube video that he had left Nickelodeon on February 2 after having worked at the studio since December 1997; he confirmed that this resulted in the end of production on Bunsen Is a Beast after one season. His latest animated program, The Garden, premiered on Pure Flix in 2023. In 2021, he returned to Nickelodeon to produce a live-action Fairly OddParents reboot show, The Fairly OddParents: Fairly Odder, which premiered on Paramount+ on March 31, 2022.

Early life
Hartman was born in Highland Park, Michigan. He received the nickname Butch as a young boy and continued to use it as an adult. Hartman spent his childhood in Roseville, Michigan, and his teenage years in New Baltimore, Michigan. He graduated from Anchor Bay High School in New Baltimore in 1983, and subsequently attended the California Institute of the Arts in Valencia, California. He graduated in 1987 with a Bachelor of Fine Arts degree. As a young student he appeared on The Match Game-Hollywood Squares Hour winning close to $3,000.

Career

Early career
While still attending CalArts, Hartman interned as an in-between animator on the Don Bluth film An American Tail. Before graduating, he was a contestant on the Match Game-Hollywood Squares Hour for three episodes and shortly after graduating, he was hired as a character designer and storyboard artist for an unidentified My Little Pony animated series. As he had no previous experience with storyboards, he was soon fired. Afterwards, he found work with Ruby-Spears, where he worked on It's Punky Brewster and Dink, the Little Dinosaur. He was also a member of the video reference crew for the Disney film Pocahontas.

In the early 1990s he was hired as an artist in the model department at Hanna-Barbera, and was eventually contacted by studio president Fred Seibert to make the shorts Pfish and Chip and Gramps for the What a Cartoon! Show. Eventually, he became a writer, director and storyboard artist for several of the early Cartoon Network shows, including Dexter's Laboratory, Johnny Bravo, Cow and Chicken, and I Am Weasel. After his contract with Hanna-Barbera expired, he went to work with Seibert at his new studio, Frederator, on the Oh Yeah! Cartoons show for Nickelodeon.

During his time working at Hanna-Barbera, he became friends with future Family Guy creator Seth MacFarlane. The two would later go on to make the short Zoomates together for Oh Yeah! Cartoons. The character Dr. Elmer Hartman in Family Guy was named after Hartman. He also voiced various characters in the show's first few seasons.

Working at Nickelodeon
His biggest success came in December 1997, when he created The Fairly OddParents. The series originally started out as a series of shorts on the anthology show, Oh Yeah! Cartoons. Eventually, Nickelodeon decided to pick the shorts up as a full series. Premiering in 2001, the adapted series ended up becoming a huge hit, second only in the ratings to SpongeBob SquarePants (and it briefly even passed SpongeBobs ratings). Following the third The Adventures of Jimmy Neutron, Boy Genius crossover The Jimmy-Timmy Power Hour 3: The Jerkinators, the series ceased production in 2006, but it was announced on Hartman's forum on February 2, 2007, that 20 more episodes would be produced; the 6th season of Fairly OddParents aired on February 18, 2008, starting with the 1-hour special Fairly OddBaby. From May 1, 2009, to May 3, 2009, the 3-part special Wishology aired; although that too was originally intended as a series finale, the series was renewed for another season. A tenth season was eventually ordered in 2015. The Fairly OddParents is Nickelodeon's second longest-running animated show behind SpongeBob.

Due to the success of The Fairly OddParents, Hartman was asked to create another show for Nickelodeon; Hartman says the President of Nickelodeon asked him if he had an idea, and before he could say the title he was given the greenlight. The show would later become Danny Phantom. To produce the show, in 2003, Hartman founded his own production company Billionfold Inc., which he also used, and still uses today, to produce his other projects. Danny Phantom received critical acclaim and is considered Hartman's best show, with Hartman himself acknowledging it as perhaps the best of his programs. Danny Phantom ended production in early 2007.

Around 2008–2009, Hartman began production his third show for Nickelodeon, T.U.F.F. Puppy, which premiered in 2010 alongside the Jimmy Neutron spin-off Planet Sheen. The series received mixed to positive reviews and ran for 3 seasons before being cancelled.

His final show, Bunsen Is a Beast, aired on Nickelodeon and Nicktoons from January 16, 2017, to February 10, 2018. On February 8, 2018, Hartman announced on his Twitter and YouTube accounts that he had left Nickelodeon as of February 2 after a 20-year run.

Other works
In 2015, Hartman launched a "kid-safe [online] network of live shows and cartoons" called the Noog Network.

In October 2017, Hartman started a podcast called Speech Bubble, on which he talks about cartoons, movies, pop culture, and various other topics. Several voice actors have appeared on the podcast, including Rob Paulsen, Tara Strong, Jerry Trainor, Grey Griffin, and Vic Mignogna. After initially posting excerpts on his primary YouTube channel, the podcast videos were later moved to its own dedicated YouTube channel, now including full episodes.

In June 2018, Hartman started a Kickstarter campaign for OAXIS Entertainment, a "family-friendly" streaming service. After the fundraising goal had been reached, it was then revealed the OAXIS was planned to be a Christian network, which was not disclosed during the fundraiser. However, Hartman later claimed that, while faith would continue to be a part of his personal life, OAXIS would not be a faith-based service.

On June 22, 2019, Hartman released the animated web series, HobbyKids Adventures. This series, produced by PocketWatch, Inc., was created for YouTube channel HobbyKidsTV. On 13 July, Hartman released a book, Mad Hustle, which details the ins and outs on pitching and selling a show in Hollywood.

In 2019, Hartman created, wrote, and produced a Christian animated web series for preschoolers called The Garden, along with his wife, Julieann. The Hartmans have already planned at least two seasons of the series and plan to launch a subscription-based app for The Garden in late 2022. Hartman's further plans for the property include creating a VBS curriculum for churches and illustrating a children's bible published by Thomas Nelson, entitled The Garden Children's Bible, which stars the characters from The Garden and is scheduled to release in 2023. The series premiered on Pure Flix on January 1, 2023, with six new episodes and more in the works.

In February 2021, Hartman was accused of plagiarism when he published his commissioned artwork of Attack on Titan character Mikasa Ackerman, in which similarities were noted to a 2018 artwork of a Japanese artist. The artist confirmed Hartman did not receive permission.

Return to Nickelodeon
In February 2021, Hartman was announced to be returning as a producer of The Fairly OddParents: Fairly Odder, a live-action/animated reboot of his original show. The show premiered on March 31, 2022.

Personal life
Hartman currently lives in Bell Canyon, California, with his wife, Julieann, and daughters, Carly and Sophia Hartman. He also has three younger brothers. Hartman is also an openly devout born-again Christian and young-Earth creationist, converting in 2000 after hearing a sermon by Frederick K. C. Price.

In 2005, Hartman, along with his wife, founded Hartman House, a non-profit organization that supports those in developing nations, as well as some of the most poverty stricken areas in the United States. Hartman House has built two homes for families in Guatemala, fed nearly 7,200 families with Thanksgiving meals in the U.S., and is in the midst of funding a school in Uganda. At Hartman House events, Hartman usually draws and autographs items related to his work for children.

Filmography

Film

Television

Internet

Written works

References

External links
 

1965 births
21st-century American male writers
21st-century American screenwriters
American animated film directors
American cartoonists
American Christians
American Christian writers
American male non-fiction writers
American male screenwriters
American male voice actors
American podcasters
American storyboard artists
American television directors
American YouTubers
Animators from Michigan
California Institute of the Arts alumni
Cartoon Network Studios people
Contestants on American game shows
Hanna-Barbera people
Living people
Nickelodeon Animation Studio people
People from Bell Canyon, California
People from Highland Park, Michigan
People from New Baltimore, Michigan
People from Roseville, Michigan
Screenwriters from California
Screenwriters from Michigan
Showrunners
Television producers from California
Television producers from Michigan
YouTube animators
YouTube channels launched in 2015